ISE Corporation ("International Space Enterprises", later "Innovative Solutions for Energy") was a manufacturer and integrator of heavy-duty hybrid electric powertrain systems for transit bus and truck use, based in San Diego and later Poway, California. ISE was founded in 1995 and filed for bankruptcy in 2010, shortly after raising $20 million in its initial public offering on the Toronto Stock Exchange.

History
ISE Corporation was founded in January 1995 by David M. Mazaika and Michael C. Simon, engineers who had formerly worked for General Dynamics. The first funding was a research grant provided by the South Coast Air Quality Management District to develop and test hybrid electric vehicles and vehicle components. ISE entered a strategic partnership with Siemens in 2002, where ISE would use the Siemens ELFA traction motor, inverter, and generator in its series hybrid drivetrain systems for the United States.

ISE started as an integrator, refitting vehicles with hybrid electric or electric power, including transit buses, tow tractors, and trucks. In the first quarter of 2005, ISE moved from San Diego to Poway.

After it declared bankruptcy in 2010, ISE sold its assets at auction to Bluways USA in February 2011 for $3.76 million.

Products
ISE Corporation had two divisions: the first, simply named ISE, supported space exploration by designing micro-rover vehicles for developing and testing space system software. The second, ISE Research, was dedicated to developing hybrid electric powertrains for heavy-duty transportation applications (Class 6 and up trucks, tow tractors, transit buses). In total, ISE shipped approximately 300 hybrid electric drivetrain systems.

 
ISE Research used the brand ThunderVolt to refer to the series hybrid drivetrains it had developed. The drivetrain included the traction motor(s) and controllers (branded ELFA, provided by Siemens), an energy storage system (battery, charger, and management; or ultracapacitor), auxiliary power unit (APU, to generate electric power for the traction motor and energy storage systems), and hybrid system controllers. As integrated into a mid-size (30') ElDorado National E-Z Rider transit bus, APU options included conventional piston engines (General Motors V8 or Cummins 5.9L), using diesel, gasoline, propane, or compressed natural gas; Capstone gas turbine; and hydrogen fuel cell.

ISE introduced the Hybrid Hydrogen Internal Combustion Engine (HHICE) variant of the ThunderVolt in 2005. The HHICE bus used a Ford Triton V10 gasoline engine that had been converted to burn hydrogen, coupled with an electric generator as the APU for the series hybrid system; it was first tested by SunLine Transit Agency. During revenue service with SunLine, the HHICE engine overheated twice and caught fire once in three separate incidents in 2007. Transport for London ordered ten hydrogen-powered buses from ISE in 2007, split equally as five fuel cell and five HHICE APU buses.

Clients
Selected users of transit buses equipped with ISE hybrid drivetrains included:

References

External links

Defunct companies based in California